Lian Pin Koh (born 1976 in Singapore) is a Singaporean conservation scientist. He is the Kwan Im Thong Hood Cho Temple Professor of Conservation, Vice Dean of Research at the Faculty of Science, Director of the Centre for Nature-based Climate Solutions, and Director of the Tropical Marine Science Institute at the National University of Singapore (NUS).

Koh was formerly the Chair of Applied Ecology and Conservation at the University of Adelaide, and Vice President of Science Partnerships and Innovation at Conservation International. He was also the Founding Director of Conservation Drones, a non-profit organisation that seeks to introduce drone technology to conservation scientists and practitioners worldwide.

Koh has received multiple awards including the Australian Research Council Future Fellowship in 2014, the Swiss National Science Foundation Professorship in 2011, the ETH Fellowship in 2008, and was also named a World Economic Forum Young Global Leader in 2013.

In 2020, Koh received a prestigious award from the National Research Foundation of the Singapore Prime Minister's Office under its Returning Singaporean Scientists Scheme. Established in 2013, the Scheme seeks to attract outstanding overseas-based Singaporean research leaders back to Singapore to take up leadership positions in Singapore's autonomous universities and publicly funded research institutes. Koh was the sixth recipient of the award.

On 14 January 2021, Koh was appointed as one of nine Nominated Members of Parliament (NMP) in the 14th Parliament of Singapore, which began on 21 January 2021.

Education and career 
Koh studied at Hwa Chong Institution for his pre-tertiary education in Singapore. He completed his Bachelor of Science (with First Class Honours) and Master of Science degrees at the National University of Singapore in 2001 and 2003, respectively.

Koh received his PhD from the Department of Ecology and Evolutionary Biology at Princeton University, New Jersey, US in 2008.

Following that, he received postdoctoral training at ETH Zurich, and in 2011, was appointed an Assistant Professor by the Swiss National Science Foundation.

In 2014, he accepted a position at the University of Adelaide as associate professor of applied ecology & conservation. He was subsequently awarded the Australian Research Council Future Fellowship (Level II) and was promoted to full Professor in 2017. Koh helped set up and served as Director of two University research centers: the Centre for Applied Conservation Science, and the Unmanned Research Aircraft Facility.

From 2018 to 2020, Koh took a hiatus from academia to join Conservation International.

In 2020, Koh accepted a position as tenured full Professor at his alma mater NUS

Research 
Koh's scientific contributions include the study of species co-extinctions and modeling the environmental impacts of industrial agriculture across the tropics.

His research focuses on developing innovative science and science-based decision support tools to reconcile societal needs with environmental protection. He addresses this challenge through field studies and experiments, computer simulations and modelling, as well as by co-opting emerging technologies for use in environmental research and applications.

His more recent research as Director of the Centre for Nature-based Climate Solutions seeks to produce policy-relevant science on nature-based climate solutions – tackling climate change by protecting and better managing natural ecosystems – to address knowledge gaps, build capacity and deliver pragmatic solutions and innovations to inform climate policies, strategies and actions to achieve the centre's vision.

Impact 
Koh has published over 140 journal articles, including Nature, Science, and Proceedings of the National Academy of Sciences USA. He is one of the most highly cited conservation scientists in the world. His research has received over 24,000 citations (with an h-index of >70).

Koh is a pioneer in the use of low-cost drone technology for environmental applications. Koh founded Conservation Drones which has received numerous awards and media coverage.

Koh was an invited speaker at the TEDGlobal 2013: Think Again conference in Edinburgh, where he spoke on the positive use of drones.

Outreach 
Koh is a regular plenary speaker at international meetings, including the WWF Fuller Symposium in 2012, the Clinton Global Initiative University in 2013, and the Intergovernmental Eye on Earth Summit in 2015.

Koh's work has been featured in international media, including the New York Times, Smithsonian Magazine, Scientific American, NewScientist, the Telegraph, among others.

References 

1976 births
Living people
Ecologists
Princeton University alumni
Academic staff of the University of Adelaide
National University of Singapore alumni
Singaporean Nominated Members of Parliament